This is a list of films set on or around St. Patrick's Day.

Crime
Between the Canals, a 2010 Irish crime film written and directed by Mark O'Connor
The Boondock Saints, a 1999 American crime film written and directed by Troy Duffy; opening scenes are set in an Irish neighborhood of Boston on St Patrick's Day
State of Grace, a 1990 neo-noir crime film directed by Phil Joanou
The Fugitive, a 1993 American crime film directed by Andrew Davis

Drama
Beau James, a 1957 biopic of Jimmy Walker
Flight of the Doves, a 1971 British film directed by Ralph Nelson
Fourteen Hours, a 1951 film noir
The Fugitive, a 1993 American film adaptation of the original TV series, starring Harrison Ford; Dr. Kimble is seen eluding the US Marshals by joining the St Patrick's Day Parade in Chicago with the dyed green river clearly visible
The Lost Weekend, a 1945 film noir directed by Billy Wilder
The Quiet Man a 1952 film
Patrick's Day, is a 2014 Irish drama film written and directed by Terry McMahon.
St. Patrick: The Irish Legend, is a 2000 television historical drama film about the life of Saint Patrick (AD 387–463) who was born in Wales and who brought Christianity to Ireland.

Fantasy
Portrait of Jennie, a 1948 fantasy film directed by William Dieterle
The Luck of the Irish, a 2001 Disney Channel Original Movie
Leapin’ Leprechauns!, is a 1995 direct-to-video American film
Spellbreaker: Secret of the Leprechauns, is a 1996 American direct-to-video film

Horror
Leprechaun 2, a 1994 American comedy horror film
Leprechaun's Revenge, a 2012 Syfy film
Maniac Cop, a 1988 slasher film directed by William Lustig
Gold Coins, a 2021 horror short directed by Matthew Mark Hunter
Unlucky Charms, a 2013 horror film directed by Charles Band
Muck, a 2015 horror film
Red Clover, a 2012 made-for-television horror movie directed by Drew Daywalt

Musical
Little Nellie Kelly, a 1940 musical film directed by Norman Taurog

Animated
The Secret of Kells, a 2009 Irish-French-Belgian animated fantasy film about the making of the Book of Kells
Song of the Sea (2014 film), (Irish: Amhrán na Mara) is a 2014 animated fantasy film directed and co-produced by Tomm Moore

See also
 List of St. Patrick's Day television specials
 Holiday horror

References

 
Lists of films set around holidays